An alumnus of the Accra Academy is referred to as a Bleoobi. Article 4 of the constitution of the Accra Academy Old Boys' Association sets the parameters for joining the association as follows:

1. Membership of the association shall in general be open to all past students of the Accra Academy since its foundation on 20th July, 1931.

2. A past student of the Accra Academy qualifies for admission into the membership of the association if he has attended the school for at least one year.

Mrs. Beatrice Abla Lokko, the first headmistress of the academy, was not enrolled at the school but was nevertheless a paid up member of the association. Charles McArther Emmanuel a.k.a. Chuckie Taylor, son to former Liberian President Charles Taylor, was enrolled at the academy but later dismissed by administrators on grounds of possessing drugs and weapons.

Academia

Natural and Applied Sciences
David Kpakpoe Acquaye   (Bleoo '48), soil scientist 
James Adjaye, genetic scientist
T. Q. Armar (Bleoo '36), Ghanaian educationist and publisher
Edwin Asomaning  (Bleoo '50), Plant pathologist; director of the Cocoa Research Institute of Ghana 
Michael McClelland (Bleoo '72), Professor of Microbiology and Genetics at the University of California, Irvine 
Richard Damoah (Bleoo '96), physicist and research scientist at NASA Goddard Space Flight Center
George Tawia Odamtten  (Bleoo '67,'69), mycologist 
Richard Orraca-Tetteh (Bleoo '51), former professor of nutrition and food science at the University of Ghana
Frank Gibbs Torto   (Bleoo '36) (foundation student), former professor of chemistry at the University of Ghana, foundation member and later president of the Ghana Academy of Arts and Sciences. First Ghanaian lecturer of the University of Ghana 
Daniel A. Wubah (Bleoo '77,'79), Microbiologist, Current president of Millersville University of Pennsylvania

Humanities and Social sciences 
Robert Addo-Fening (Bleoo '53), Professor of History
Emmanuel Akwetey, Politics and Governance Expert, executive director of the Institute for Democratic Governance (IDEG)
Ayikwei Bulley (Bleoo '44), Professor of Psychology, pioneer of the study of psychology in Ghana
V.C.R.A.C. Crabbe   (Bleoo '43), Legal scholar  
Peter Quartey  (Bleoo '87), economist 
Kwadzo Senanu (Bleoo '51) Professor of English, former acting Vice Chancellor of University of Ghana (1983-1985)

Medicine

Joseph Kpakpo Acquaye (Bleoo '57), Professor of Haematology, president of the West African College of Physicians (2003–2004) 
Hutton Ayikwei Addy (Bleoo '50), Professor of Public Health, first Dean of the Medical School of the University for Development Studies, founding academic staff of the Kwame Nkrumah University of Science and Technology School of Medical Sciences 
Rexford S. Ahima (Bleoo ‘76;'78), Bloomberg Distinguished Professor and Director of the Division of Endocrinology, Diabetes and Metabolism, Johns Hopkins University School of Medicine
Emmanuel Quaye Archampong  (Bleoo '51), Emeritus Professor at the Department of Surgery and former Dean of the University of Ghana Medical School, president of the West African College of Surgeons (1997–1999)   
Jacob Amekor Blukoo-Allotey (Bleoo '48), physician; pioneer in pharmacology studies at the University of Ghana Medical School 
Alex Dodoo (Bleoo '83), professor at the Centre for Tropical Clinical Pharmacology, University of Ghana Medical School
J. F. O. Mustaffah (Bleoo '50), first Ghanaian neurosurgeon
Nii Otu Nartey (Bleoo '73), Professor of Oral Pathology, first Dean of the University of Ghana Dental School and CEO of the Korle-Bu Teaching Hospital (2009-2013)
Isaac Odame (Bleoo '74), Professor of Haematology, Medical Director of the Global Sickle Cell Disease Network
Jacob Plange-Rhule (Bleoo '76;’78), formerly Rector of the Ghana College of Physicians and Surgeons, and president of the Ghana Medical Association 
Cornelius Odarquaye Quarcoopome (Bleoo '43), Professor of ophthalmology, first Ghanaian eye specialist, president of the Ghana Medical Association (1978-1980) and first director of the Noguchi Memorial Institute for Medical Research

The Arts

Actors
Chris Attoh (Bleoo '96), actor, television presenter, producer and model

Artists

Bright Tetteh Ackwerh (Bleoo '06), Satirical Artist
Eric Adjetey Anang (Bleoo '05), Sculptor
Prince Gyasi (Bleoo '13), Visual Artist
Ray Styles (Bleoo '06), Pencil artist
Constance Swaniker (Bleoo '93), Sculptor

Literature
Amu Djoleto, author of The Strange Man (1967), Money Galore (1975), and Hurricane of Dust (1987), among many other novels, short stories, and poems
Ellis Ayitey Komey, Ghanaian writer and poet 
Kwei Quartey (Bleoo '73), Ghanaian American novelist and surgeon 
Rex Quartey (Bleoo '63), Ghanaian writer and poet

Music

Nana Kofi Asihene, Music video director 
Gafacci (Bleoo '06), sound engineer
Jerry Hansen (Bleoo '47), musician, founder of the Ramblers International Band, first president of the Musicians Union of Ghana (MUSIGA)
KiDi (Bleoo '12), musician
King of Accra (Bleoo '05), sound engineer
Zapp Mallet (Bleoo '82), sound engineer
Danny Nettey (Bleoo '88), musician
Scientific, musician
Reggie Zippy (Bleoo '03), musician

Entrepreneurs and business leaders
 
Felix E. Addo (Bleoo '73), Chairman of Guinness Ghana Breweries, former Country Senior Partner of PwC Ghana   
Nathan Kwabena Adisi (aka Bola Ray) (Bleoo '96), CEO of EIB Network Group 
Nana Awuah Darko Ampem I (Bleoo '51), founder and first chairman of Vanguard Assurance
 T. E. Anin (Bleoo '51), managing director and chairman of the board of directors of the Ghana Commercial Bank (1972–1980)  
Hilary Denise Arko-Dadzie (Bleoo '90), ARIPO business executive
Sulemanu Koney, CEO of the Ghana Chamber of Mines
Solomon Lartey (Bleoo '93), formerly CEO of Activa International Insurance  
Tei Mante (Bleoo '66), former Vice-Chairman of Ecobank Transnational
Felix Nyarko-Pong (Bleoo '78), Formerly CEO of uniBank
Emmanuel Noi Omaboe (Bleoo '50), former chairman & managing director of E.N. Omaboe & Associates 
Julian Opuni (Bleoo '90), managing director of Fidelity Bank
John Kobina Richardson (Bleoo '55), former chairman & managing director of Pioneer Tobacco

Journalists and media personalities

News agencies & Newspapers
Goodwin Tutum Anim (Bleoo '50), first African General Manager of the Ghana News Agency
Ben Ephson (Bleoo '75), founder and Managing Editor of the Daily Dispatch (1997–)
Eric Kwame Heymann, (Bleoo '47), first Editor-in-chief of the Accra Evening News

Radio & Television  
Francis Abban, journalist, host of Starr FM's Morning Show  and host of State of Affairs on GHOne TV.
Randy Abbey (Bleoo '92), host of Good Morning Ghana on Metro TV
David Anaglate, newsman and former GBC Director-General 
Earl Ankrah (Bleoo '88), broadcast journalist and former host of GTV's Breakfast Show
Brown Berry, Host of Weekend Rush on YFM   
Joe Lartey Snr. a.k.a. 'Over To You' Joe Lartey, formerly of GBC Sports and Federal Radio Corporation of Nigeria (FRCN), Ranked amongst the top five African football commentators by Goal. 
Israel Laryea (Bleoo '94), broadcast journalist, news editor and anchor, programme host at Multimedia Group Limited.
Bola Ray (Bleoo '96), host of Starr Chat on Starr FM, host of Revealed With Bola Ray
Akwasi Sarpong (Bleoo '95), journalist at BBC World Service

Law

Attorney-Generals
Nicholas Yaw Boafo Adade (Bleoo '46), Attorney General of Ghana in the NLC and the Busia government (1969–1971)
Gustav Koranteng-Addow (Bleoo '39), former appeal court judge and former Attorney General of Ghana in the SMC government (1975–1979)
George Commey Mills-Odoi (Bleoo '37), first Ghanaian Attorney General of the Republic of Ghana (1960–1961)
Betty Mould-Iddrisu (Bleoo '73), first female Attorney General of Ghana (2009–2011)

Supreme Court Judges

Nicholas Yaw Boafo Adade (Bleoo '46), Justice of the Supreme Court of Ghana (1989–1996) and Acting Chief Justice of Ghana (1990–1991)
Fred Kwasi Apaloo (Bleoo '42), 6th Chief Justice of Ghana and 8th Chief Justice of Kenya
Samuel Kwame Adibu Asiedu (Bleoo '85), Active Justice of the Supreme Court of Ghana (2022–date)
Samuel Azu Crabbe (Bleoo '39), Justice of the East African Court of Appeal (1963–1965) and 5th Chief Justice of Ghana
V.C.R.A.C. Crabbe (Bleoo '43), Justice of the Supreme Court of Ghana (1970–1972) and (1979–1981), and first electoral commissioner of Ghana
Jones Victor Mawulorm Dotse (Bleoo '72), Active Justice of the Supreme Court of Ghana (2008–date) 
George Lamptey (Bleoo '51), Justice of the Supreme Court of Ghana (2000–2002)
George Commey Mills-Odoi (Bleoo '37), Justice of the Supreme Court of Ghana (1964–1966) and Acting Chief Justice of Ghana (July 1965)
Walter Samuel Nkanu Onnoghen (Bleoo '74), 15th Chief Justice of Nigeria
Edward Kwame Wiredu, 10th Chief Justice of Ghana

Other legal figures
Kofi Acquah-Dadzie (Bleoo '64), Former Justice of the High Court of Botswana (Assistant Registrar and Master)
Emmanuel Akwei Addo (Bleoo '62), Former Judge of the Court of Appeal; former member of International Law Commission of the United Nations
Kissi Agyebeng (Bleoo '96), Special Prosecutor (2021–)
Frederick Bruce-Lyle (Bleoo '72), High Court Judge of the Eastern Caribbean Supreme Court (1999-2016)
Lebrecht James Chinery-Hesse, Chief Parliamentary Draftsman, Solicitor-General and Acting Attorney General of Ghana (1979)

Military

Army

Joseph Narh Adinkra (Bleoo '70), Chief of the Army Staff, 2009–2013
Joseph Arthur Ankrah (Bleoo '37), first Commander of the Ghana Army (First Ghanaian Chief of the Ghana Army Staff) (1961–1962), Chief of the Defence Staff (1967–1968)
W. W. Bruce-Konuah, Chief of the Army Staff, June 1979–July 1979
Neville Alexander Odartey-Wellington (Bleoo '54), Chief of the Army Staff, 1978–1979
Edward Kwaku Utuka (Bleoo '57), former Border Guards Commander and member of the Supreme Military Council I&II

Navy

David Animle Hansen (Bleoo '42), first Commander of the Ghana Navy (first Ghanaian Chief of the Naval Staff), instrumental in establishing and expanding the Ghana Navy

Politics, Royalty and Government

Head of State

Joseph Arthur Ankrah (Bleoo '37), Second Head of State of Ghana and 4th Chairperson of the Organisation of African Unity (now African Union)

Speakers of Parliament

Edward Doe Adjaho (Bleoo '77), 11th Speaker of the Parliament of Ghana
Peter Ala Adjetey (Bleoo '51), 8th Speaker of the Parliament of Ghana
Daniel Francis Annan (Bleoo '45), 7th Speaker of the Parliament of Ghana and former appeal court judge

Ministers

William Codjoe Omaboe Acquaye-Nortey (Bleoo '48), Greater Accra Regional Commissioner (1972–1973), Upper Regional (now Upper East and Upper West regions) Commissioner (1973–1975), Western Regional Commissioner (September 1975– October 1975)
Nicholas Yaw Boafo Adade (Bleoo '46), Minister for Interior (1971–1972)
John Tetteh Doi Addy ( Bleoo '45), Western Regional Commissioner (1966–1967),  Ashanti Regional Commissioner (1967–1968)
Ebenezer Ako-Adjei (Bleoo '36),  member of the "Big Six", first Minister for Interior; Minister of Trade and Minister of Foreign Affairs in Nkrumah's government
Kwaku Ofori Asiamah (Bleoo '92), Minister for Transport (2017–2021) (2021– )
Paul Boateng (Bleoo '68), the UK's first black Cabinet Minister, Chief Secretary to the Treasury (UK) (2002–2005), current member of the House of Lords (UK) (2010–)
Ebenezer Ato Ayirebi-Acquah, Deputy Minister for Defence (1996–1997)
William Godson Bruce-Konuah (Bleoo '51), Minister for Works and Housing (1969–1971) and Minister for labour and Cooperatives (1971–1972)  
Ohene Djan (Bleoo '43), Ministerial Secretary to the Ministry of Finance (1951–1954)
Alfred Jonas Dowuona-Hammond, Minister for Education (1960–1964) and Minister for Communications (1964–1966)
Kofi Dzamesi (Bleoo '80), Volta Regional Minister (2005–2009) and Minister for Chieftaincy and Religious Affairs (2017–2021)
Harona Esseku (Bleoo '53), Minister of Transport and Communications (1969–1971) (youngest minister in the Busia government) and Chairman of the New Patriotic Party (2001–2005)
David Animle Hansen (Bleoo '42), Greater Accra Regional Commissioner (1966–1967) 
John Willie Kofi Harlley (Bleoo '39), Deputy Head of State of Ghana (1966–1969), Commissioner for Foreign Affairs (1967–1968) and Commissioner for Interior (March 1969–August 1969)
Walter Horace Kofi-Sackey (Bleoo '50), Ministerial Secretary to the Ministry of Works (1969–1972) 
Chris Kpodo (Bleoo '65), Deputy Minister for Foreign Affairs and Regional Integration (2009-2012)
Betty Mould-Iddrisu (Bleoo '73 ), Minister for Education (2011–2012)
Emmanuel Noi Omaboe (Bleoo '50), Commissioner for Economic Affairs (1966–1969) 
Nathan Quao (Bleoo '34), Secretary at the Office of the PNDC (1984–1992) 
Gideon Quarcoo (Bleoo '69), Deputy Minister for Communications (2009-2012)
Nana Akuoko Sarpong (Bleoo '57), Secretary for Health (1988–1991) and Secretary for Interior (1991–1992)
Harry Sawyerr (Bleoo '46), Minister of Transport and Communications (1979–81) and Minister for Education (1993–1997)
Paul Tagoe, Greater Accra Regional Minister (1964–1965) and First Parliamentary Secretary (1965–1966) 
William Adjei Thompson (Bleoo '58), Greater Accra Regional Commissioner (1975-1977) & Secretary (1985-1986) (1988-1991),  Brong Ahafo Regional Commissioner (1977-1978), Central Regional Commissioner (1978-1979), Western Regional Secretary (1986-1988)
Neville Alexander Odartey-Wellington (Bleoo '54), Commissioner for Health (1975–1978) and Commissioner for Agriculture (January 1979–June 1979)

Other political figures
Hugh Horatio Cofie-Crabbe (Bleoo '36) Executive Secretary of the Convention People's Party (1961–1962)

Diplomats
Ebenezer Akuete (Bleoo ‘55), Ghana's Ambassador to the United States (January 1982 - December 1982)
Oscar Ameyedowo (Bleoo '69), Ghana's Ambassador to China (1997–2001)
David Anaglate, Ghana's Ambassador to Togo (1996–2001)
Paul Boateng (Bleoo '68), British High Commissioner to South Africa (2005–2009)
Frank Baffoe (Bleoo '52), Ghanaian academic, and honorary consul to Lesotho 
Morgan Adokwei Brown (Bleoo '78), Ghana's Ambassador to Belgium (2012–2016) and Ghana High Commissioner to Zambia (2016–2017)
W. W. Bruce-Konuah, military attache to Ghana's High Commission in Pakistan, and Minister Consular at the Ghana Embassy in the United States  
Ben C. Eghan (Bleoo '66), Ghana's High Commissioner to Malaysia (2014–2017)
Joe-Fio Neenyann Meyer (Bleoo '40), Ghana Ambassador to Tanzania (1961–1963) and Ghana Ambassador to China (1964–1966)
Clifford Amon Kotey (Bleoo '71), Ghana's Ambassador to Morocco (2009–2013) 
Chris Kpodo (Bleoo '65), Ghana's High Commissioner to the United Kingdom (March 2001 - October 2001) and Ghana's ambassador to Congo (2002–2004)
Joseph Boye Lomotey (Bleoo '39), Ghana's Ambassador to Yugoslavia (1969–1970)
Samuel Odoi-Sykes, Ghana's High Commissioner to Canada (2001–2006) and Chairman of the New Patriotic Party (1998–2001)
George Adjei Osekre (Bleoo '53), Ghana Ambassador to Egypt (1979–1981) 
Richard Oblitey Solomon (Bleoo '76), Ghana's ambassador to Equatorial Guinea (2006-2009)
Theodosius Okan Sowa (Bleoo '41), Ghana's first Consul-General to the United Nations; Ghana Ambassador to Mali (1977–1983)
Nathan Quao (Bleoo '35), former diplomat and presidential advisor 
Patrick Amoah-Ntim, Ghana's  ambassador to Serbia and Montenegro (2001–2005)
Kwame Asamoah Tenkorang (Bleoo '72), Ghana ambassador to Libya (2008–2009), Ghana ambassador to Japan (2009–2011) and Ghana High Commissioner to Kenya (2016–2017)

Members of Parliament
Richie Agyemfra-Kumi, member of Parliament for the Akropong Constituency (1992–1996)
Oscar Ameyedowo (Bleoo '69), member of Parliament for the Asebu Constituency (1992–1996)
Edward Benjamin Kwesi Ampah Jnr (a.k.a. Eddie Ampah) (Bleoo '45), member of Parliament for the Asebu Constituency (1965–1966)
Ahmed Arthur (Bleoo '89), member of Parliament for the Okaikwei South Constituency (2013–2021)
Reginald Nii Bi Ayibonte (Bleoo '82), member of Parliament for the Odododiodio Constituency (2001–2004)
Ohene Djan (Bleoo '43), member of parliament for the Akuapem/New Juaben Constituency (1951–1954)
Ebenezer Ato Ayirebi-Acquah, member of Parliament for the Effutu Constituency (1992–1996)
Wisdom Gidisu (Bleoo '86), member of Parliament for the Krachi East Constituency (2005–2017) and (2021–)
Eric Kwame Heymann (Bleoo '47), member of Parliament for the Buem Constituency (1965–1966)
Emmanuel Welbeck Nortey, member of Parliament for the Korle Klottey Constituency (1992–1996)
 Samuel Odoi-Sykes, member of parliament for the Ashiedu Keteke Constituency (1979–1981), and minority leader of parliament (1980–1981)
 Paul Edward Affum Okwabi (Bleoo '40), member of Parliament for the Guan Constituency (1965–1966)
 George Adjei Osekre (Bleoo '53), member of Parliament for the Kpeshie Constituency (1969–1972)
 Joboe Williams, former member of the Liberian House of Representatives for Sinoe County

Monarchs 
Nana Akuoko Sarpong (Bleoo '57), Omanhene of Agogo Traditional Area (1976–)
Nana Wereko Ampem II (Bleoo '50), Gyaasehene of Akuapem and Ohene of Amanokrom (1975–2005), chancellor of the University of Ghana (1999–2005)
Osagyefo Kuntunkununku II (Bleoo '62), 34th Okyenhene and Paramount Chief of Akyem Abuakwa (1976–1999); President of the National House of Chiefs (1998–1999)
Neenyi Ghartey VII (Bleoo '75), Omanhene of Winneba, Effutu traditional area (1996–)
Nana Nkuah Okomdom II, Paramount Chief of the Sefwi Wiawso Traditional Area (1997–2011)
Nana Ofosu Peko III (Bleoo '77, '79), Safohene of Breman Traditional Area (2017- )

Public Servants

Ghana 
Jacob Blukoo-Allotey, (Bleoo '48), former chairman and managing director of the State Pharmaceutical Corporation 
Gilbert Boafo Boahene (Bleoo '46), Secretary to the Supreme Military Council (1979)
Alex Dodoo (Bleoo '83), Director General of Ghana Standards Authority (2017–)
Harry Dodoo (Bleoo '38), former chairman and managing director of Ghana Cocoa Board & first Ghanaian chartered accountant  
Robert Dodoo (Bleoo '54), Head of the Civil Service (1993–2001) 
Kofi Dzamesi (Bleoo '80), CEO of Bui Power Authority (2022–) 
Ben C. Eghan (Bleoo '66), Secretary to the Cabinet (2009-2013)
John Willie Kofi Harlley (Bleoo '39), Second Ghanaian Commissioner of Police (1 January 1965 – 24 February 1966) and first Inspector General of Police (IGP) of the Ghana Police Service (25 February 1966 – 3 September 1969)
Lebrecht Wilhelm Fifi Hesse (Bleoo '54), first Black African Rhodes Scholar at Oxford University and former Director-General of the Ghana Broadcasting Corporation (1972–1975) and (1984–1990)   
Alex Mould (Bleoo '78), CEO of the National Petroleum Authority (NPA) (2009–2013) and CEO of the Ghana National Petroleum Corporation (GNPC) (2013–2017) 
Henry Plange Nyemitei (Bleoo '38), pioneering executive of SIC Insurance Company    
Emmanuel Noi Omaboe (Bleoo '50), Government Statistician (1960-1966)
Adjebu Osah-Mills (Bleoo '38), Establishment Secretary (1961–1967)
Nathan Quao (Bleoo '35), Cabinet Secretary and former Head of the Civil Service  
Edward Quist-Arcton (Bleoo '42), first Ghanaian Chief Conservator of Forests
Amadu Sulley (Bleoo '75), Deputy Commissioner of the Electoral Commission of Ghana (2012–2018)

International

Kwaku Aning (Bleoo '60), Deputy Director General of the International Atomic Energy Agency (2010–2015) and Chairman of the Governing Board of the Ghana Atomic Energy Commission (2017–)
Joseph Bennet Odunton (Bleoo '39), first black African to hold an appointment at the Buckingham Palace; Assistant Press Secretary to Queen Elizabeth II (1959–1960)

Religion
Francis William Banahene Thompson (Bleoo '49), Anglican Bishop Emeritus of the Anglican Diocese of Accra (1983–1996)

Sports

Athletes
John Myles-Mills (Bleoo '86), former national athlete; African 200m silver medallist
Leo Myles-Mills (Bleoo '92), former national athlete, Ghana 100m record holder of 9.99s; African 4X100m gold medallist

Footballers

Lee Addy, Ghana national football team (Blackstars) (2009–2012)
Godfried Aduobe (Bleoo '92), Ghana national football team (Blackstars) (2003) and former KSC professional player
Owusu Afriyie (Bayie) (Bleoo '95), footballer
Prince Koranteng Amoako (Bleoo '91), Ghana national football team (Blackstars) (1995–2002)
Denny Antwi, footballer
Asamoah Gyan (Bleoo '02), Ghana national football team (Blackstars) (2003–date), most capped player for the Ghana National team and Ghana's top goal scorer
Princeton Owusu-Ansah (Bleoo '92), Ghana national football team (Blackstars) (1997–2002)

Sports Administrators 
Randy Abbey (Bleoo '92), owner and president of Heart of Lions Football Club; Executive Council Committee Member of the Ghana Football Association
Anim Addo (Bleoo '94), football agent; Executive Council Committee Member of the Ghana Football Association   
Prosper Harrison Addo (Bleoo '94), General Secretary of the Ghana Football Association
N.A. Adjin-Tettey (Bleoo '51), former national athletics coach; former chair of the Ghana Amateur Athletics Association 
Ohene Djan (Bleoo '43), Director of Sports at the Central Organization of Sports(COS) during the first republic; founder of the Ghana national football team (Black stars), the Ghana Premier League and the Ghanaian FA Cup; first president of the Ghana Football Association. Former vice president of CAF. Ghana's national stadium was named in his honour.
A.K. Konuah (Bleoo '33), Secretary and founding member of the Ghana Amateur Athletics Association
Henry Plange Nyemitei (Bleoo '38), former president and first executive chairman of Accra Hearts of Oak football club; former chairman of the Ghana Football Association and former president of the West Africa Sports Federation

Others
Alhassan Brimah (Bleoo '56), Professional Boxer, 1962 Africa Middleweight Champion 
Daniel Nii Laryea (Bleoo '06), FIFA and CAF referee

Notable faculty

Nana Akufo-Addo, Current President of the republic of Ghana 
Ken Ofori-Atta, co-founder of Databank Group and current Minister for Finance
Prince Kofi Amoabeng, co-founder of defunct UT Bank
Komla Agbeli Gbedemah, Minister for Finance (1954–1961), Minister for Health (1961–1963), and founder and leader of the National Alliance of Liberals
E. R. T. Madjitey, First Ghanaian Commissioner of the Ghana Police, minority leader of the second republic and leader of the Justice Party 
M.F. Dei-Anang, Head of African Affairs Secretariat in the office of the President in the first republic
Kwadwo Agyei Agyapong, one of the three High Court judges that were abducted and murdered on June 30, 1982. 
Peter Nortsu-Kotoe, MP for Akatsi-North

References

Lists of Ghanaian people by school affiliation

Education in Accra